North Korea competed as the Democratic People's Republic of Korea at the 1988 Winter Olympics in Calgary, Alberta, Canada.

Competitors
The following is the list of number of competitors in the Games.

Figure skating

Men

Women

Speed skating

Men

Women

References

Official Olympic Reports
 Olympic Winter Games 1988, full results by sports-reference.com

Korea, North
1988
1988 in North Korean sport